The men's shot put event at the 2016 IAAF World U20 Championships was held in Bydgoszcz, Poland, at Zdzisław Krzyszkowiak Stadium on 19 July. A 6 kg (junior implement) shot was used.

Medalists

Results

Final
19 July

Qualifications
19 July
With qualifying standard of 19.40 (Q) or at least the 12 best performers (q) advance to the Final

Summary

Details
With qualifying standard of 19.40 (Q) or at least the 12 best performers (q) advance to the Final

Group A
19 July

Group B
19 July

References

Shot put
Shot put at the World Athletics U20 Championships